Cerasuolo may refer to:

 Cerasuolo, Molise, a village in the Molise region of Italy
 Cerasuolo di Vittoria, a DOCG red wine from Sicily, Italy
 Cerasuolo d'Abruzzo, a DOC rosato (rosé) wine from Abruzzo, Italy